Gongkang Road is a station on Shanghai Metro Line 1.

References

Line 1, Shanghai Metro
Shanghai Metro stations in Jing'an District
Railway stations in China opened in 2004
Railway stations in Shanghai